Sayan may refer to:

Places 
 Sayan Mountains, a mountain range in Siberia
 Sayan, India, a city in India
 Sayan, Bali, a village in Indonesia
 Sayan, Iran, a village in Iran
 Sayán District, Peru

Other uses 
 Sayan (name)
 Sayana, 14th century Indian commentator on the Vedas
 The singular for Sayanim, Jewish diaspora who provide logistical support for Mossad

See also
 
 Sayun, a city in the region and Governorate of Hadhramaut, Yemen
 Sayyan, a town in Yemen
 Syan (disambiguation)
 Sian (disambiguation)